Habyor is the third album by drummer Jim Black's AlasNoAxis featuring clarinetist/saxophonist Chris Speed, guitarist Hilmar Jensson and bassist Skúli Sverrisson recorded in 2004 and released on the Winter & Winter label.

Reception

In his review for Allmusic, Sean Westergaard said " this isn't really a jazz album. It's a rock album, but they use a horn player instead of a singer. Despite what some jazz purists may say, this doesn't make the music any less interesting or less valuable. In fact, if it's taken at face value, without expectations, it's a great album". On AllAboutJazz John Kelman stated "Habyor may not make fans of purist jazz fans, but with singable melodies over mostly assertive rhythms, he creates engaging music that may draw more rock-oriented listeners over to the "dark side"." In JazzTimes, Bill Milkowski observed "Black has crafted a distinctive collection that goes for the simplicity of songs and the power of a unified band sound".

Track listing
All compositions by Jim Black
 "Talk About" - 4:04  
 "Z" - 4:25  
 "Rade" - 6:45  
 "Cha" - 5:28  
 "Part Wolf" - 5:56  
 "Hello Kombiant" - 3:28  
 "Let It Down" - 6:05  
 "Be Real" - 4:32  
 "Endgatherers" - 6:39  
 "Stay Go" - 4:21

Personnel
Jim Black - drums, Wurlitzer piano, melodica, handsonic
Chris Speed - clarinet, tenor saxophone, Wurlitzer piano, accordion, casiotone
Hilmar Jensson - electric guitar 
Skúli Sverrisson - electric bass

References

Winter & Winter Records albums
Jim Black albums
2004 albums